5'-Methoxyhydnocarpin (5′-MHC) is a chemical compound that has been isolated from Berberis and Hydnocarpus wightianus.

5′-MHC potentiates the antimicrobial effect of berberine in vitro.

References

Benzopyrans
Polyphenols